The little tinamou (Crypturellus soui) is a species of tinamou. It is found in Central and South America, as well as on the Caribbean island of Trinidad.

Etymology
Crypturellus is formed from three Latin or Greek words.  kruptos meaning covered or hidden, oura meaning tail, and ellus meaning diminutive.  Therefore, Crypturellus means small hidden tail.

Taxonomy
The little tinamou is one of 21 species in the genus Crypturellus, the most species-rich genus of tinamous. All tinamous are in the family Tinamidae, and in the larger scheme are also palaeognaths, a group that includes the more widely known flightless ratites such as ostriches and emus.  Unlike the ratites, though, tinamous can fly, although in general they are not strong fliers.  All palaeognaths evolved from flying ancestors.

Subspecies
 C. s. meserythrus occurs in southern Mexico, Belize, Honduras, Guatemala, El Salvador, and northern and eastern Nicaragua.
 C. s. modestus occurs in Costa Rica and western Panama.
 C. s. capnodes occurs in the lowlands of northwestern Panama.
 C. s. poliocephalus occurs in Pacific coastal Panama; Veraguas, Herrera, Los Santos, Coclé, and western Panamá Provinces.
 C. s. caucae occurs in the Magdalena River valley of north central Colombia.
 C. s. harterti occurs on the Pacific slope of Colombia and Ecuador.
 C. s. mustelinus occurs in northeastern Colombia and extreme northwestern Venezuela.
 C. s. caquetae occurs in southeastern Colombia; Meta Department, Caquetá, Vaupés, and Guaviare Departments.
 C. s. nigriceps occurs in eastern Ecuador and northeastern Peru.
 C. s. soui occurs in eastern Colombia, eastern and southern Venezuela, French Guiana, Guyana, Suriname, and northeastern Brazil.
 C. s. albigularis occurs in eastern and northern Brazil.
 C. s. inconspicuus occurs in northern Bolivia and central and eastern Peru.
 C. s. andrei occurs in Trinidad and northern Venezuela; Falcón, Yaracuy, Carabobo, Aragua, Vargas, Miranda, northern Anzoátegui, Sucre, Monagas States, and the Venezuelan Capital District
 C. s. panamensis occurs on both coasts of Panama and the Pearl Islands of Panama (an ancient introduction).

Distribution and habitat

They are also fairly successful utilizing cleared forests and plantations or farmed land.

Behavior
Little tinamou are shy, secretive, and pair-solitary animals. Despite their abundance, they are rarely sighted. In the field, they are detected by sound more often than sight. The whistle call is a soft, descending whinny (also a series of single notes, tempo increasing at end) produced by both sexes. They eat seeds, berries, and some insects. They can fly but will run unless flight is necessary. They are highly territorial and will attack when encroached upon if the intruding bird is not their mate. There is evidence that they will maintain the same territory for years.

Breeding
The breeding season of the little tinamou ranges from May to October. Nests are a small depression in forest floor, sometimes lined with a few leaves at the base of a tree or in dense brush. Females perform courtship behavior and eggs are incubated by males. Male nest attendance is strong, up to 14 days without leaving the nest in one study. They typically lay two glossy dark-purple eggs (up to three have been observed). Young are precocial, and begin pecking the ground on the first day. They can run almost as soon as they hatch. By weeks 3-4 they are capable of full flight. Egg laying begins at one year old.

Description
Although it looks similar to other ground-dwelling birds like quail and grouse, it is unrelated to those groups. It has an unbarred sooty-brown plumage which transitions to grey on the head. The foreneck is whitish. While the underside of both male and female is cinnamon buff, the female is a lighter shade. The legs can be grey, olive, or yellow. Both male and female are almost tailess.

Conservation

Footnotes

References
 
 
 Brooks, Daniel M. “Behavior, Reproduction, and Development in Little Tinamou (Crypturellus Soui).” The Wilson Journal of Ornithology, vol. 127, no. 4, 2015, pp. 761–65. JSTOR, http://www.jstor.org/stable/24640589. Accessed 15 Jun. 2022.
 
 
 
 
Hilty, Birds of Venezuela,

External links
Little Tinamou videos, photos & sounds on the Internet Bird Collection
Little Tinamou photo gallery VIREO

Crypturellus
Tinamous of South America
Birds of Brazil
Birds of the Amazon Basin
Birds of the Caribbean
Birds of the Guianas
Birds of Bolivia
Birds of Colombia
Birds of Ecuador
Birds of Panama
Birds of Peru
Birds of Venezuela
Birds of Trinidad and Tobago
Birds of Central America
Birds of Mexico
Birds of the Yucatán Peninsula
Birds of Guatemala
Birds described in 1783